Romania participated in the Eurovision Song Contest 2019 with the song "On a Sunday" written by Ester Alexandra Crețu, Alexandru Șerbu and Ioana Victoria Badea. The song was performed by Ester Peony. The Romanian broadcaster  (TVR) organised the national final  2019 in order to select the Romanian entry for the 2019 contest in Tel Aviv, Israel. The national final consisted of three shows: two semi-finals on 27 January and 10 February 2019, respectively, and a final on 17 February 2019. A total of twenty-four entries were selected and twelve competed in each semi-final where a five-member jury panel selected five entries to advance to the final, while a public vote selected an additional entry to enter the final. The twelve qualifiers competed in the final where "On a Sunday" performed by Ester Peony was selected as the winner after scoring top marks from a six-member international jury panel and a public televote.

Romania was drawn to compete in the second semi-final of the Eurovision Song Contest which took place on 16 May 2019. Performing during the show in position 6, "On a Sunday" was not announced among the top 10 entries of the second semi-final and therefore did not qualify to compete in the final. It was later revealed that Romania placed thirteenth out of the 18 participating countries in the semi-final with 71 points.

Background 

Prior to the 2019 contest, Romania had participated in the Eurovision Song Contest 19 times since its first entry in 1994. To this point, its highest placing in the contest has been third place, which the nation achieved on two occasions: in 2005 with the song "Let Me Try" performed by Luminița Anghel and Sistem, and in 2010 with the song "Playing with Fire" performed by Paula Seling and Ovi. Having qualified to the final on every occasion since the introduction of semi-finals to the format of the contest between 2004 and 2017, Romania failed to qualify to the final for the first time in 2018 with the song "Goodbye" performed by the Humans.

The Romanian national broadcaster,  (TVR), broadcasts the event within Romania and organizes the selection process for the nation's entry. TVR has consistently selected the Romanian Eurovision entry through national finals that feature a competition among several artists and songs. The broadcaster confirmed their intentions to participate at the 2019 Eurovision Song Contest on 20 September 2018. TVR had set up national finals with several artists to choose both the song and performer to compete at Eurovision for Romania, a procedure which the broadcaster opted for once again to select their 2019 entry.

Before Eurovision

Selecția Națională 2019 
 2019 was the national final organised by TVR in order to select Romania's entry for the Eurovision Song Contest 2019. The competition consisted of three shows: two semi-finals featuring twelve songs each and a final featuring twelve songs to be held on 27 January, 10 February and 17 February 2019, respectively. Under the slogan  ("Fulfill the dream!"), the shows were hosted by Ilinca Avram and Aurelian Temișan, and were televised on TVR 1, TVR HD, TVRi as well as online via the broadcaster's streaming service TVR+ and YouTube. The three shows were also broadcast in Moldova via the channel TVR Moldova.

Competing entries 
TVR opened a submission period for artists and composers to submit their entries between 9 November 2018 and 10 December 2018. The broadcaster received 126 submissions after the submission deadline passed. An expert committee reviewed the received submissions with each juror on the committee rating each song between 1 (lowest) and 10 (highest) based on criteria such as the melodic harmony and structure of the song, the orchestral arrangement, originality and stylistic diversity of the composition and sound and voice quality. After the combination of the jury votes, the top twenty-four entries that scored the highest were selected for the national final. The competing entries were announced on 20 December 2018. Among the competing artists was Dan Bittman, who previously represented Romania in the Eurovision Song Contest in 1994, and Mihai, who previously represented Romania in the Eurovision Song Contest in 2006.

The members of the expert committee that selected the twenty-four entries were:

George Balint –  music journalist
Felix Crainicu –  host
Horea Ghibuţiu – unsitedemuzica.ro music journalist
Bogdan Miu – DigiFM music journalist and host
Bogdan Pavlică –  host
Răzvan Popescu – Radio ZU host
Andreea Remeţan – Virgin Radio Romania host
Gabriel Scîrlet – TVR musical director
Oliver Simionescu – Kiss FM disc jockey
Liana Stanciu – TVR music journalist
Dragoş Vulgaris – Pro FM and Chill FM music journalist

On 2 January 2019, "", written and to have been performed by Dan Bittman, was withdrawn from the competition and replaced with the songs "Army of Love" performed by Bella Santiago and "Renegades" performed by Linda Teodosiu after TVR opened an additional submission period between 8 and 10 January 2019, during which 9 submissions were received. "Baya", written by Mihai Trăistariu, Michael James Down, Will Taylor and to have been performed by Mihai, and "Independent", written by Alex Luft, Eduard Santha, Denisa Demian and Alexandra Șipoș and to have been performed by Xandra, were withdrawn from the competition on 12 January and 8 February 2019, respectively.

Semi-finals 
In each semi-final eleven to twelve songs competed and six qualified to the final. A jury panel consisting of Adi Cristescu (singer, composer), Mihai Georgescu (singer-songwriter), Crina Mardare (vocal coach), Andy Platon (composer, producer, DJ) and Mugurel Vrabete (musician) first selected five songs to advance, with the remaining entries then facing a public televote which determined an additional qualifier.

In addition to the performances of the competing entries, the first semi-final featured performances from Iuliana Beregoi, and the second semi-final featured performances from Alessandro Canino and the band Hit Italy.

Final 
Twelve songs competed and the winner, "On a Sunday" performed by Ester Peony, was determined by the combination of the votes from a six-member international jury panel (6/7) and public televoting (1/7). The members of the jury panel that voted during the final were: William Lee Adams (American journalist, Wiwibloggs editor), Deban Aderemi (British composer, vlogger, Wiwibloggs editor), Alex Calancea (Moldovan artist, producer, composer), Șerban Cazan (Romanian producer), Tali Eshkoli (Israeli entrepreneur, show producer, content editor) and Emmelie de Forest (Danish singer, Eurovision Song Contest 2013 winner). In addition to the performances of the competing entries, the interval acts featured performances by Emmelie de Forest performing the songs "Sanctuary" and "Only Teardrops", Eurovision Song Contest 2018 winner Netta Barzilai performing the songs "Toy" and "Bassa Sababa", as well as Golden Stag Festival 2018 winner Inis Neziri performing the songs "" and "Man's World".

Promotion 
Ester Peony made several appearances across Europe to specifically promote "On a Sunday" as the Romanian Eurovision entry. On 6 April, Ester Peony performed during the Eurovision in Concert event which was held at the AFAS Live venue in Amsterdam, Netherlands and hosted by Cornald Maas and Marlayne. On 21 April, Ester Peony performed during the Eurovision Pre-Party Madrid event which was held at the Sala La Riviera venue in Madrid, Spain and hosted by Tony Aguilar and Julia Varela.

At Eurovision
According to Eurovision rules, all nations with the exceptions of the host country and the "Big Five" (France, Germany, Italy, Spain and the United Kingdom) are required to qualify from one of two semi-finals in order to compete for the final; the top ten countries from each semi-final progress to the final. The European Broadcasting Union (EBU) split up the competing countries into six different pots based on voting patterns from previous contests, with countries with favourable voting histories put into the same pot. On 28 January 2019, a special allocation draw was held which placed each country into one of the two semi-finals, as well as which half of the show they would perform in. Romania was placed into the second semi-final, to be held on 16 May 2019, and was scheduled to perform in the first half of the show.

Once all the competing songs for the 2019 contest had been released, the running order for the semi-finals was decided by the shows' producers rather than through another draw, so that similar songs were not placed next to each other. Romania was set to perform in position 6, following the entry from Latvia and before the entry from Denmark.

All three shows were broadcast in Romania on TVR 1, TVRi and TVR HD with commentary by Liana Stanciu and Bogdan Stănescu. The Romanian spokesperson, who announced the top 12-point score awarded by the Romanian jury during the final, was Ilinca who previously represented Romania in 2017.

Semi-final

Ester Peony took part in technical rehearsals on 2 and 5 May, followed by dress rehearsals on 10 and 11 May. This included the jury show on 10 May where the professional juries of each country watched and voted on the competing entries.

The stage show featured Ester Peony wearing a glittery black dress and accompanied by two dancers in the centre stage representing two spirits (water and fire) imprisoned in a haunted house, two backing vocalists on the left bridge of the stage representing ghosts held captive in the house for several generations, and a guitarist on the right bridge of the stage. The performance began with Peony sitting down on a red armchair in front of the background LED screens which displayed various dark backgrounds with pyrotechnic flame effects appearing from the ground. A pyrotechnic waterfall effect was also featured at the end of the performance with the screens displaying blasts of fire and large pink roses. The dancers that joined Ester Peony on stage were Valentin Cristian Chiș and Vlad Mircea, the backing vocalists were Adela-Daniela Baranci and Antonia Elena Liță, while the guitarist was the co-composer of "On a Sunday" Alexandru Șerbu.

At the end of the show, Romania was not announced among the top 10 entries in the second semi-final and therefore failed to qualify to compete in the final. It was later revealed that Romania placed thirteenth in the semi-final, receiving a total of 71 points: 24 points from the televoting and 47 points from the juries.

Voting
Voting during the three shows involved each country awarding two sets of points from 1-8, 10 and 12: one from their professional jury and the other from televoting. Each nation's jury consisted of five music industry professionals who are citizens of the country they represent, with their names published before the contest to ensure transparency. This jury judged each entry based on: vocal capacity; the stage performance; the song's composition and originality; and the overall impression by the act. In addition, no member of a national jury was permitted to be related in any way to any of the competing acts in such a way that they cannot vote impartially and independently. The individual rankings of each jury member as well as the nation's televoting results were released shortly after the grand final.

Below is a breakdown of points awarded to Romania and awarded by Romania in the second semi-final and grand final of the contest, and the breakdown of the jury voting and televoting conducted during the two shows:

Points awarded to Romania

Points awarded by Romania

Detailed voting results
The following members comprised the Romanian jury:
 Liana Stanciu (jury chairperson)presenter
 artist, singer
 Monica Anghelartist, singer, represented Romania in the 2002 contest
 Andrei Kerestelyproducer, composer
 Bogdan Pavlicămusic journalist

Notes and references

Notes

References

External links 
 Official TVR Eurovision site

2019
Countries in the Eurovision Song Contest 2019
Eurovision